Klecany is a town in Prague-East District in the Central Bohemian Region of the Czech Republic. It has about 3,600 inhabitants.

Administrative parts
Villages of Drasty, Klecánky and Zdibsko are administrative parts of Klecany.

Geography
It lies in the Prague Plateau, on the right bank of the Vltava River.

History
The first written mention of Klecany is from 1316. In 1507, it was promoted to a market town by King Vladislaus II. In 1994 it became a town.

Sights
The main landmark of Klecany is the Klecany Castle. After it was destroyed by fire, it was rebuilt into its current neo-Empire form in 1924. Today the castle is privately owned and inaccessible to the public.

In Drasty is a valuable farmyard from the turn of the 18th and 19th centuries.

Notable people
Václav Beneš Třebízský (1849–1884), writer; worked here as a chaplain in 1876–1884

References

External links

Cities and towns in the Czech Republic
Populated places in Prague-East District